Kumkum Mohanty (born 10 September 1946) is an Odissi dancer.

Mohanty was born at Cuttack. She received training from Guru Kelucharan Mohapatra at Kala Vikash Kendra. She is recognised for abhinaya.
She has worked as the special secretary (Culture) to the Government of Odisha. After her retirement in 2004, she started her dance school Geeta govinda in 2006, in Bhubaneshwar. Currently she joined as an adjunct professor at School of Humanities, Social Sciences & Management, IIT Bhubaneswar

Awards
Guru Kelucharan Mahapatra Award, 2011
Padma Shri, 2005
Sangeet Natak Akademi Award, 1994
Odisha Sangeet Natak Akademi, 1993
2nd Nrutyangada Samman

References

External links
 Geeta Govinda, website

1946 births
Living people
People from Cuttack
Odissi exponents
Recipients of the Padma Shri in arts
Utkal University alumni
Performers of Indian classical dance
Recipients of the Sangeet Natak Akademi Award
Indian civil servants
Teachers of Indian classical dance
Indian dance teachers
Indian female classical dancers
20th-century Indian dancers
Dancers from Odisha
20th-century Indian women artists
Women artists from Odisha
Educators from Odisha
20th-century Indian educators
Women educators from Odisha
20th-century women educators